The Eastern Neisse, also known by its Polish name of Nysa Kłodzka, is a river in southwestern Poland, a left tributary of the Oder, with a length of 188 km (21st longest) and a basin area of 4,570 km2 (3,742 in Poland).

Prior to World War II it was part of Germany. During the Yalta Conference it was discussed by the Western Allies as one possible line of the western Polish border. Attempts were made to negotiate a compromise with the Soviets on the new Polish-German frontier; it was suggested that the Eastern Neisse be made the line of demarcation. This would have meant that (East) Germany could have retained approximately half of Silesia, including most of Wrocław (formerly Breslau). However the Soviets rejected the suggestion at the Potsdam Conference and insisted that the southern boundary between Germany and Poland be drawn further west, at the Lusatian Neisse.

Floods
The Eastern Neisse originates in the Śnieżnik mountain range of the Sudetes, near the border with the Czech Republic. It is partially regulated. The river has often left its banks and flooded nearby towns, at times destroying them completely. Town chronicles from Kłodzko mention floods in the following years:

 14th century: 1310
 15th century: 1441, 1464, 1474
 16th century: 1500, 1522, 1524, 1560, 1566, 1570, 1587, 1589, 1591, 1598,
 17th century: 1602, 1603, 1605, 1610, 1611, 1612, 1625, 1646, 1652, 1655, 1689, 1693, 1696
 18th century: 1702, 1703, 1713, 1724, 1735, 1736, 1740, 1755, 1763, 1767, 1775, 1785, 1787, 1789, 1799
 19th century: 1804, 1806, 1827, 1828, 1829, 1831, 1850, 1854, 1879, 1881, 1883, 1891, 1897
 20th century: 1900, 1903, 1907, 1938, 1952, 1997, 1998

Towns
 	
Until 1945, these communities were situated on German territory and largely populated by Germans before they were driven out at the end of the Second World War. German names are indicated in italics.
 	
 Bardo (Wartha)
 Bystrzyca Kłodzka (Habelschwerdt)
 Kamieniec Ząbkowicki (Kamenz N.S.)
 Kłodzko (Glatz)
 Lewin Brzeski (Löwen)
 Międzylesie (Mittelwalde) - both names mean "middle of the woods"
 Nysa (Neiße)
 Otmuchów (Ottmachau)
 Paczków (Patschkau)

See also

 Lusatian Neisse (Lužická Nisa, Nysa Łużycka)
 Raging Neisse (Nysa Szalona)
 Nysa Mała (Little Neisse)
 Rivers of Poland
 Geography of Poland

Notes

Rivers of Poland
Rivers of Lower Silesian Voivodeship
Rivers of Opole Voivodeship